The Taihoku Air Strike was an air raid by the military of the Republic of China against the metropolitan perimeter of Taihoku (modern-day Taipei), the capital of Japanese Taiwan, during February 1938. The raid was the first attack on Imperial Japanese territory during the course of World War II, and one of the few offensive operations conducted by China directly against Japan during the course of the war.

Operation
The Taihoku Air Strike Operation was conducted by the Republic of China Air Force, using a squadron of nine Martin 139 bombers. The aircraft were deployed from an airfield in either Chekiang or Fukien province, and flew uncontested over the Taiwan Strait. Once over metropolitan Taihoku, the aircraft dropped leaflets, or according to some sources made a minor bombing strike, and successfully returned to the mainland, under Japanese antiaircraft fire. Contemporary newspaper accounts stated that eight people were killed and 25 were wounded.

While achieving little militarily, this represented the first instance of an air raid over Japanese territory, preceding the Doolittle raid against Tokyo by four years.

One foreign eyewitness, American diplomat George H. Kerr, described the air raid to the foreign press, and mentioned that as a result, sand barricades were built around important government and commerce buildings, anti-aircraft guns were deployed, and internal security strengthened against possible fifth column activity by the local ethnic Chinese population.

Notes

See also
Taihoku Air Raid
Development of Chinese Nationalist air force (1937–45)

Battles of the Second Sino-Japanese War
1938 in China
1938 in Japan
Taiwan under Japanese rule
1938 in Taiwan